A Christmas Story Christmas is a 2022 American Christmas comedy film directed by Clay Kaytis with a script he co-wrote with Nick Schenk, from an original story co-written by Schenk and Peter Billingsley. It is a legacy sequel to A Christmas Story (1983) and is the eighth installment in the Parker Family Saga franchise, while ignoring the events of My Summer Story (1994) and A Christmas Story 2 (2012). The film was produced by Billingsley and Vince Vaughn along with Cale Boyter, Jay Ashenfelter, Marc Toberoff and Irwin Zwilling. Billingsley reprises his role as Ralphie Parker alongside Ian Petrella, Scott Schwartz, R. D. Robb, Zack Ward, and Yano Anaya returning as Randy Parker, Flick, Schwartz, Scut Farkus, and Grover Dill, respectively. Erinn Hayes, River Drosche, and Julianna Layne play Ralphie's wife and kids, with Julie Hagerty (replacing Melinda Dillon from the original film) as Mrs. Parker. In the film, after the Old Man dies, Ralphie takes his family to his childhood home, reuniting with his mom and old friends, while being tasked to deliver a memorable Christmas.

A Christmas Story Christmas was released in the United States on November 17, 2022 on HBO Max.

Plot
In December 1973, 33 years after the events of A Christmas Story, Ralphie Parker lives in Chicago with his wife Sandy and two children, Mark and Julie. Ralphie has been taking the year off from his job to write his first novel, but its excessive length leads multiple publishers to reject it. Mrs. Parker calls to tell Ralphie that his father, "the Old Man", has died, and the grief-stricken family makes its way to Hohman, Indiana, to be with her. She gives Ralphie two tasks: write his father's obituary and take up his mantle of making Christmas special for the family. 

Ralphie's children befriend one of the Bumpus kids next door and are bullied by two children on a snowmobile. Ralphie reunites with Flick, who now owns his father's old tavern, and Schwartz, who still lives with his mother and has run up a large tab at Flick's. While leaving the house to go ice skating, Sandy slips and sprains her ankle. 

As Christmas Eve approaches, the family goes to Higbee's, where Ralphie miraculously buys everything Mark and Julie asked for while their children wait in line to see Santa. On the way back, Ralphie’s car breaks down again and Ralphie accidentally hits Julie in the eye during an impromptu snowball fight, which requires a trip to the emergency room and a temporary eyepatch. All of the gifts are stolen from the car's popped trunk when the family is inside the hospital, and Sandy has little money left to replace them. 

Back at Flick's, Flick offers to forgive Schwartz’s tab if he completes a physical stunt, the "Ramp". Schwartz succeeds and his tab is forgiven, but afterwards Mark breaks his arm sledding and Ralphie is rejected by his final prospective publisher.  After some comfort from Sandy and remembering the Christmases of yesteryear, Ralphie suddenly gains a burst of inspiration and writes a piece that far exceeds the length of a normal obituary. However, he leaves it on the desk, needing to prepare for Christmas Day. Mark and Julie manage to get back at their bullies by building a snowman over a tree stump so that their snowmobile crashes.

That night, though, Julie becomes upset after the tree's star falls and breaks. Ralphie, frustrated, goes out against his wife and mother's urgings to find a new one. Because all of the stores are closed, Ralphie breaks into Flick’s tavern to "borrow" the star from the tree. On his way out, he is caught and apprehended by Scut Farkus, now a Hohman police officer. Ralphie is terrified at what Scut will do to him, but Scut brings him home, saying he owes Ralphie because their fight set him on a better path in life. 

On Christmas morning, Ralphie is confused by compliments he receives about his piece in the newspaper. Sandy reveals she found the obituary manuscript and took it to the local paper, and its high quality led to it quickly being syndicated. Ralphie is offered a new job as a syndicated columnist, fulfilling his dream of leaving the rat race and becoming a full-time writer. Opening presents, it is discovered that the Old Man had bought and personally wrapped very thoughtful gifts for the family shortly before his death. Much of the town soon comes to the Parker house for Christmas dinner. After dinner concludes, the core family asks Ralphie to read his story about the Old Man. Ralphie takes a seat and begins to read, fully embracing his new role as the Old Man's successor as his narration of it transitions into Jean Shepherd's from the original film.

Cast
 Peter Billingsley as Ralph "Ralphie" Parker
 Erinn Hayes as Sandy Parker, Ralph's wife
 Julie Hagerty as Mrs. Parker, Ralph's mother
 Ian Petrella as Randy Parker, Ralph's brother
 Scott Schwartz as Flick, one of Ralph's childhood friends
 R. D. Robb as Schwartz, one of Ralph's childhood friends
 Zack Ward as Officer Scut Farkus, Ralph's former childhood bully
 River Drosche as Mark Parker, Ralph's son
 Billy Brayshaw as Older Mark Parker (in Ralph's imagination)
 Julianna Layne as Julie Parker, Ralph's daughter
 Tegan Grace Muggeridge as Older Julie Parker (in Ralph's imagination)
 Cailean Galloway as Snowmobile Bully
 Alistair Galloway as Snowmobile Bully
 Yano Anaya as Grover Dill, Ralph's childhood bully (in Ralph's imagination)
 David Gillespie as Santa Claus

Production
In January 2022, Warner Bros. Pictures and Legendary Pictures announced that a legacy sequel to A Christmas Story was in development with a script from Nick Schenk who also is executive producer. Clay Kaytis was hired to direct. The film is dedicated to the memory of Darren McGavin (who played Ralphie's Old Man in the original film), who died on February 25, 2006, at the age of 83.

Shortly after the official announcement of the film, Peter Billingsley was cast to reprise his role as Ralphie Parker as an adult, in addition to being a producer alongside Vince Vaughn. Julie Hagerty was cast as Mrs. Parker; Melinda Dillon (who had played the role in A Christmas Story) was in poor health and ultimately died two months after the film was released.

The following month, Ian Petrella, Scott Schwartz, R. D. Robb, Zack Ward, and Yano Anaya were cast to reprise their roles as Randy Parker, Flick, Schwartz, Scut Farkus, and Grover Dill, respectively. Erinn Hayes, River Drosche, and Julianna Layne were cast as Ralphie's wife, Sandy Parker, and his kids, Mark and Julie Parker, respectively. 

Principal photography began in late February 2022 in Hungary and Bulgaria. Billingsley and the crew commissioned exact replicas of the house which was depicted in the original film and of the neighborhood.

Release
The first teaser trailer was released in October 2022, confirming the official release date, with the full trailer following on November 1. The film was released in the United States on November 17, streaming on HBO Max by Warner Bros. Pictures.

Reception

See also
 List of Christmas films

References

External links
 

2022 films
2022 comedy films
2020s American films
2020s children's comedy films
2020s Christmas comedy films
2020s English-language films
Alternative sequel films
American children's comedy films
American Christmas comedy films
American sequel films
Films based on American novels
Films directed by Clay Kaytis
Films set in 1973
Films set in Chicago
Films set in Indiana
Films shot in Hungary
Films shot in Bulgaria
Films with screenplays by Nick Schenk
Midlife crisis films
HBO Max films
Legendary Pictures films
Warner Bros. films